Assassinator Jing Ke is a 2004 Chinese television series based on a semi-fictional story of the assassin Jing Ke, who, in 227 BC, attempted to kill Ying Zheng, the king of Qin. Directed by Raymond Lee, the series starred Liu Ye as the titular protagonist, with Peter Ho, Zheng Jiayu, Zhang Tielin, Shao Bing and Zhai Ying playing supporting roles.

Plot
In 260 BC, the Qin state inflicts a devastating defeat on the Zhao state at the Battle of Changping. A group of refugees flees from Zhao and settles down in the Lively Valley, an isolated paradise-like world. Two young men, Jing Ke and Fan Wuji, grew up in the valley with their common love interest, Ye Xiaohu. When Fan Wuji learns that his ancestral roots are actually from Qin, he leaves them and returns to his native state, where he becomes a subordinate of the infamous Qin general Bai Qi. On the other hand, Jing Ke and Ye Xiaohu travel to the Qi state and settle there. As Ye Xiaohu is tired of leading a wandering life, she leaves Jing Ke and marries a rich man, who abuses her all the time. Ye Xiaohu plots with the rich man's henchman, Nie Wuya, to kill her husband and seize his fortune, and then frame Jing Ke for the murder.

Jing Ke is arrested and almost executed, but is saved by Tian Guang, who recommends him to join an assassin organisation. Later, he becomes an apprentice of a powerful swordsman and inherits his master's legendary skills. However, as he completes more missions, he feels that he is pursuing a life that he does not want, especially after he witnesses the death of his second love interest, Yunxi. At the same time, he strikes up a close friendship with the musician Gao Jianli. Meanwhile, in the Qin state, Fan Wuji wins the favour of Ying Zheng, the King of Qin, for his distinguished service on the battlefield, but unknowingly incurs the jealousy of the chancellor Lü Buwei.

Jing Ke's adventures lead him to the Yan state, where he meets Crown Prince Dan, who requests his help in assassinating the ruthless Ying Zheng to save the other states from being conquered by the Qin state. Dan was initially held hostage in Qin, but was released by Fan Wuji. Fan Wuji, who is now denounced as a traitor by Ying Zheng, flees to Yan to join Jing Ke and Crown Prince Dan. Jing Ke accepts the mission. Fan Wuji aids him by committing suicide because Ying Zheng has already placed a high price on Fan's head for treason. Jing Ke embarks on his no-return quest, bringing along with him Fan Wuji's head and a map of Dukang with a dagger concealed inside. Jing Ke's attempt on Ying Zheng's life would be a celebrated story in Chinese history.

Cast
 Liu Ye as Jing Ke
 Peter Ho as Gao Jianli
 Wang Ya'nan as Fan Wuji
 Shao Bing as Ying Zheng, the King of Qin
 Zhang Tielin as Lü Buwei (reprising his role from the 2001 TV Series "Lü Buwei: Hero in Times of Disorder (亂世英雄呂不韋)")
 Zhai Ying as Yunxi
 Zheng Jiayu as Ye Xiaohu
 Elvis Tsui as Bai Qi
 Li Qian as Princess Wanlan
 Huang Jue as General Hao Yue
 Wu Jun as Nie Wuya
 Feng Shaofeng as Crown Prince Dan of Yan
 Han Xiao as Meng Yan
 Liu Weihua as Tian Guang
 Jin Shugui as King Xi of Yan
 Liu Liwei as Lady Xu

See also
 The Emperor and the Assassin

External links
  Assassinator Jing Ke on Sina

2004 Chinese television series debuts
Chinese wuxia television series
Cultural depictions of Qin Shi Huang
Television series set in the Zhou dynasty
Mandarin-language television shows
Television shows written by Yu Zheng
Television series set in the 3rd century BC